Edmond Carey (6 March 1883 – 26 March 1943) was an Irish politician. A vintner, he was an unsuccessful independent candidate at the June 1927 general election, but was elected to Dáil Éireann as a Cumann na nGaedheal Teachta Dála (TD) for the Cork East constituency at the September 1927 general election. He lost his seat at the 1932 general election.

References

1883 births
1943 deaths
Independent politicians in Ireland
Cumann na nGaedheal TDs
Members of the 6th Dáil
Politicians from County Cork